1999 was the last year of the 1990s as well as the penultimate year of the 20th century and the 2nd millennium.

1999 may also refer to:

Film, TV and entertainment
 1999 (film), a 2009 Canadian crime drama film
 Space: 1999, a 1975–1977 British television series
 1999: Hore, Mita koto ka! Seikimatsu, a Famicom game released only in Japan
 In 1999, a 1912 vaudeville sketch
 Archer: 1999, the tenth season of the animated television series, Archer

Music

Albums
 1999 (Prince album), 1982
 1999 (Cassius album), 1999
 1999 (Joey Badass mixtape), 2012
Ratt (album), album by Ratt often referred to as "1999"

Songs
 "1999" (Prince song), 1982
 1999: The New Master, a 1999 EP containing remixes of the above song
 "1999" (Charli XCX and Troye Sivan song), 2018
 "1998" (instrumental), a track by Binary Finary also known by its remix/reissue name "1999"

Other
 NGC 1999, a dust filled bright nebula